Michael Neil Shadlen (born August 19, 1959) is an American neuroscientist and neurologist, whose research concerns the neural mechanisms of decision-making. He has been Professor of Neuroscience at Columbia University since 2012 and a Howard Hughes Medical Investigator since 2000. He a member of the Kavli Institute for Brain Science, a Principal Investigator at the Mortimer B. Zuckerman Mind Brain Behavior Institute and an elected member of the National Academy of Medicine.

Shadlen is a jazz guitarist and interested in the relation between jazz and neuroscience.

Education
Shadlen earned a Bachelor of Arts degree in biology at Brown University in 1981. He completed his Ph.D. in neurobiology at the University of California, Berkeley in 1985 under the direction of Ralph D. Freeman. Shadlen completed his M.D. at Brown University's Alpert Medical School in 1988.

Career 
Shadlen completed his residency at Stanford University School of Medicine where he was Chief Resident from 1991to 1992 and Clinical Instructor from 1993 94. He pursued neuroscience as a postdoctoral researcher at Stanford in the lab of William Newsome before joining the faculty of the Department of Physiology and Biophysics at the University of Washington. Shadlen became a Howard Hughes Medical Investigator in 2000.

Shadlen joined Columbia University in 2012 as Professor of Neuroscience. Нe is a member of the Editorial Board for Current Biology.

Awards and honors
Shadlen was elected a Member of the National Academy of Medicine in 2014 and a Fellow of the American Association for the Advancement of Science in 2015.

Other awards include:
 1995-1997 McKnight Scholar Award
2007 Swartz foundation Mind-Brain Lecture, Stony Brook University
2009 Alden Spencer Prize, Columbia University
2012 Golden Brain Award of the Minerva Foundation
2014 Fellow of Association for Psychological Science
2017 Karl Spencer Lashley Award, American Philosophical Society

References

External links
 Neurotree

1959 births
Living people
Science teachers
Columbia University faculty
Columbia Medical School faculty
Howard Hughes Medical Investigators
Brown University alumni
University of California, Berkeley alumni
Fellows of the Association for Psychological Science
Alpert Medical School alumni
Members of the National Academy of Medicine